UGC 2369 is a pair of galaxies and interacting galaxies in the constellation Aries, about 424 million light-years away. The two galaxies are called UGC 2369N and UGC 2369S.

A tenuous bridge of gas, dust and stars can be seen connecting the two galaxies, created when they pulled material out into space across the diminishing divide between them. Interaction between galaxies is not an uncommon event, however, two similarly sized ones merging is rare. The images released by NASA show both the galaxies distorting as they pulled closer. In the images, a thin bridge of gas, dust and stars can also be seen. The ridge was developed when the gap between both of the galaxies started diminishing.

See also 

 Mice Galaxies
 NGC 4302
 Antennae Galaxies

References 

Interacting galaxies